The Grand Slam in tennis is the achievement of winning all four major championships in one discipline in a calendar year, also referred to as the "Calendar-year Grand Slam" or "Calendar Slam". In doubles, a team may accomplish the Grand Slam playing together or a player may achieve it with different partners. Winning all four major championships consecutively but not within the same calendar year is referred to as a "non-calendar-year Grand Slam", while winning the four majors at any point during the course of a career is known as a "Career Grand Slam".

The Grand Slam tournaments, also referred to as majors, are the world's four most important annual professional tennis tournaments. They offer the most ranking points, prize money, public and media attention, the greatest strength and size of field, and the longest matches for men (best of five sets, best of three for the women). The tournaments are overseen by the International Tennis Federation (ITF), rather than the separate men and women's tour organizing bodies, the Association of Tennis Professionals (ATP) and Women's Tennis Association (WTA), but both the ATP and WTA award ranking points based on players' performances in them.

The four Grand Slam tournaments are the Australian Open in January, the French Open from late May to early June, Wimbledon in late June to early July, and the US Open in August–September, with each played over two weeks. The Australian and the United States tournaments are played on hard courts, the French on clay, and Wimbledon on grass. Wimbledon is the oldest tournament, founded in 1877, followed by the US in 1881, the French in 1891, and the Australian in 1905, but it was not until 1925 that all four were held as officially sanctioned majors.

History

With the growing popularity of tennis, and with the hopes of unifying the sport's rules internationally, the British and French tennis associations started discussions at their Davis Cup tie, and in October 1912 organized a meeting in Paris, joined by the Australasian, Austrian, Belgian, Spanish, and Swiss associations. They subsequently formed the International Lawn Tennis Federation (ILTF), holding their first meeting in 1913, joined by the Danish, German, Dutch, Russian, South African, and Swedish organizations. Voting rights were divided based on the perceived importance of the individual countries, with Great Britain's Lawn Tennis Association (LTA) receiving the maximum six votes. Three tournaments were established, being designated as "World Championships":
 World Grass Court Championships, played on grass courts.
 World Hard Court Championships, played on clay courts.
 World Covered Court Championships, played on an indoor wood surface.
The LTA was given the perpetual right to organize the World Grass Court Championships, to be held at Wimbledon, and France received permission to stage the World Hard Court Championships until 1916. Anthony Wilding of New Zealand won all three of these World Championships in 1913.

The United States National Lawn Tennis Association (USNLTA) expressed disagreement over the power distribution within the ILTF and the designation of "World Championship" status to the British and French tournaments, and thus initially refused to join the Federation, choosing instead to be bystanders to their meetings. By the 1920s, with the World Covered Court Championships failing to attract top players and the growing success of American and Australian tennis, the ILTF worked to convince the USNLTA to join them, meeting their demand to drop the designation of "World Championships" from all three tournaments in March 1923, which led to the demise of both the World Covered Court Championships and the World Hard Court Championships. A new category of "Official Championships" was created for the national championships of Britain, France, Australia, and the US. By the 1930s, these four tournaments had become well defined as the most prestigious in the sport.

In 1933, Jack Crawford won the Australian, French, and Wimbledon Championships, leaving him just needing to win the last major event of the year, the U.S. Championships, to become the reigning champion of all four major tournaments, a feat described as a "Grand Slam" by sports columnist Alan Gould of The Reading Eagle, and later that year by John Kieran of The New York Times. The term 'Grand Slam' originates from the card game contract bridge, where it is used for winning all possible tricks, and entered tennis via golf, where it was used for the first time to specifically describe a total of 4 wins, specifically Bobby Jones' achievement of winning the four major golf tournaments three years earlier in 1930. "Grand Slam" or "Slam" has since also become used to refer to the tournaments individually.

At the time, only amateur players were allowed to participate in the Grand Slam and other ILTF-sanctioned tournaments. Amateur standing, regulated by the ILTF alongside its associated national federations, forbade players from receiving prize money, earning pay by teaching tennis, being contracted by promoters and playing paid exhibition matches, though expense payments were allowed along with certain monies from sporting goods companies or other benefactors. Amateurs who "defected" to become professional were banned from competing in amateur tournaments and dropped from their national associations. The first professional tour was established in 1926 by promoter C. C. Pyle with a troupe of American and French players, most notably Suzanne Lenglen, playing exhibition matches to paying audiences. Over the next decades many other head-to-head tours were run and professional tournaments established, with three, the U.S. Pro Tennis Championships, French Pro Championship and Wembley Championships, standing out, and now considered to have been the professional majors and equivalents to the then-amateur Grand Slam tournaments. By the 1950s, largely due to efforts of player/promoter Jack Kramer, this lucrative parallel circuit was luring in most of the star amateurs on the men's side, much to the ire of the ILTF and organizers of the Grand Slam tournaments. It was an open secret that those that remained as amateurs were receiving under-the-table payments from their national associations to dissuade them from joining the pro ranks and secure their availability for the majors and Davis Cup, a practice derisively referred to as 'shamateurism' that was seen as undermining the integrity of the sport.

Tensions over this status quo, which had been building for decades, finally came to a head in 1967. In an experiment, the first tournament open to professional tennis players played on Centre Court at Wimbledon, the Wimbledon Pro, was staged by the All England Lawn Tennis Club in August, offering a prize fund of US$45,000. The tournament was deemed very successful, with packed crowds and the play seen as being of higher quality than the amateur-only Wimbledon final held two weeks earlier. This success in combination with large signings of top players to two new professional tours—World Championship Tennis and the National Tennis League—convinced the LTA on the need for open tennis. After a British proposal for this at the annual ILTF meeting was voted down, the LTA revolted, and in its own annual meeting in December it voted overwhelmingly to admit players of all statuses to the 1968 Wimbledon Championships and other future tournaments in Britain, "come hell or high water". The eventual backing of the USNLTA that came after a February 1968 vote forced the ILTF to yield and allow each nation to determine its own legislation regarding amateur and professional players, which it voted for in a special meeting in March 1968. This marked the start of the Open Era of tennis, with its first tournament, the 1968 British Hard Court Championships, beginning three weeks later on 22 April in Bournemouth, England, while the first open Grand Slam tournament, the 1968 French Open, was held in May.

Even after the advent of the Open Era, players including John McEnroe and Chris Evert have pointed out that skipping majors was not unusual before counting major titles became the norm, especially the Australian Open because of the travelling distance involved and the inconvenient dates close to Christmas and New Year. There were also the contracted professional players who had to skip some major events like the French Open in the 1970s because they were committed to the more profitable pro circuits. In one case, Australian players including Rod Laver, Ken Rosewall and Roy Emerson who had contracts with George MacCall's National Tennis League were prevented from participating in the 1970 Australian Open because the financial guarantees were deemed insufficient.

Although it has been possible to complete a Grand Slam in most years and most disciplines since 1925, it was not possible from 1940 to 1945 because of interruptions at Wimbledon, the Australian and French Championships due to World War II, the years from 1970 to 1985 when there was no Australian tournament in mixed doubles, 1986 when there was no Australian Open, and 2020 when Wimbledon was cancelled due to the COVID-19 pandemic.

Tournaments
The Grand Slam of tennis comprises these four major tournaments:

Australian Open

The Australian Open is the first Grand Slam tournament of the year, played annually in late January and early February. The inaugural edition took place in November 1905 on the grass courts of the Warehouseman's Cricket Ground in Melbourne, Australia. It was held as the Australasian Championships until 1927 and thereafter as the Australian Championships until the onset of the Open Era in 1969, passing through various venues in Australia and New Zealand before settling at the Kooyong Lawn Tennis Club in Melbourne between 1972 and 1987. Since 1988, it has been played on the hard courts of the Melbourne Park sports complex, which currently uses GreenSet as its court manufacturer.

Managed by Tennis Australia, formerly the Lawn Tennis Association of Australia (LTAA), the tournament struggled until the mid-1980s to attract the top international players due to its distance from Europe and America and proximity to the Christmas and holiday season, but it has since grown to become one of the biggest sporting events in the Southern Hemisphere and the highest attended Grand Slam tournament, with more than 812,000 people attending the 2020 edition.

Nicknamed the "Happy Slam" and billed as "the Grand Slam of Asia/Pacific", it has become known for its modernity and innovation, being the first Grand Slam tournament to feature indoor play and install retractable roofs on its main courts, the first to schedule night-time men's singles finals, and the first to substitute electronic line calling for line judges, using an expanded version of the Hawk-Eye technology known as "Hawk-Eye Live".

The tournament was designated a major championship by the International Lawn Tennis Federation in 1923. Nowadays, its draws host 256 singles players, 128 doubles teams and 32 mixed doubles teams, with the total prize money for the 2021 tournament being A$71,500,000.

French Open

The French Open, also known as Roland Garros, is the second Grand Slam tournament of the year, played annually in late May and early June. It was first held in 1891 on the sand courts of the Societé de Sport de Île de Puteaux, in Puteaux, Île-de-France, and repeatedly changed venues over the years before settling on the clay courts at the Stade Roland-Garros in Paris, France, where it has been contested since 1928. Both the venue and the tournament are named "Roland Garros" after the pioneering French aviator.

Organized by the Fédération française de tennis (FFT), formerly known as the Fédération Française de Lawn Tennis until 1976, the French Open is the only Grand Slam tournament played on a red clay surface. It is generally considered to be the most physically demanding tennis tournament in the world.

Until 1925, the tournament was known as the Championnats de France (French Championships), and only French players and foreign members of French clubs were eligible to compete in it. Before then, the World Hard Court Championships was considered the premier clay championship in France as it admitted international competitors, and it is therefore often seen as the true precursor to the modern French Open. From 1925 onward, the French Championships became open to all international amateurs and was rebranded as Internationaux de France (French Internationals), and it was first held as an International Lawn Tennis Federation–sanctioned major championship in the same year.

Today, it has draws that host 256 singles players, 128 doubles teams and 32 mixed doubles teams, with the total prize money for the 2022 tournament being €43,600,000. The 2018 edition saw a record attendance of 480,575 spectators.

Wimbledon

The Wimbledon Championships, commonly known as Wimbledon, is the third Grand Slam tournament of the year, played annually in late June and early July. It was first held on 1877 at the All England Lawn Tennis and Croquet Club, at the time located off Nursery Road in Wimbledon, London, England. The tournament has always been contested at this club, which moved to its present site off Church Road in 1922 in order to increase its attendance capacity.

Wimbledon is organized by a committee of management consisting of nineteen members, with twelve being club members and the remaining seven nominated by the Lawn Tennis Association (LTA). As the world's oldest tennis event, it is widely regarded as the most prestigious tennis tournament, and it is known for its commitment to longstanding traditions and guidelines. It is one of few tournaments and the only Grand Slam event that is still played on grass courts, tennis's original surface, and where "lawn tennis" originated in the 1800s. Players are required to wear all-white attire during matches, and they are referred to as "Gentlemen" and "Ladies". There is also a tradition where the players are asked to bow or curtsy towards the Royal Box upon entering or leaving Centre Court when either the Prince of Wales or the monarch are present.

The tournament was given the title "World Grass Court Championships" by the International Lawn Tennis Federation between 1912 and 1923, and was designated a major championship following the abolition of the three ILTF World Championships. Since 1937, the BBC has broadcast the tournament on television in the United Kingdom, with the finals shown live and in full on television in the country each year. The BBC's broadcast of the 1967 edition was among the first colour television broadcasts in the UK.

Today, the event has draws that host 256 singles players, 128 doubles teams and 32 mixed doubles teams, with the total prize money for the 2021 tournament being £35,016,000, and 500,397 people attending the 2019 edition. The tournament has some of the longest running sponsorships in sports history, having been associated with Slazenger since 1902, and with the Robinsons fruit drink brand since 1935.

US Open

The US Open is the fourth and final Grand Slam tournament of the year, played annually in late August and early September. It was first held in August 1881 on grass courts at the Newport Casino in Newport, Rhode Island, United States. The tournament constantly changed venues in its early years, with each discipline continuing to be held separately at various venues until 1923, when the tournament settled at the West Side Tennis Club in Forest Hills, Queens, New York City. In 1978, it moved to the hardcourts of the USTA Billie Jean King National Tennis Center in Flushing Meadows, Queens, where it has been contested ever since.

Organized by the United States Tennis Association (USTA), previously known as the United States National Lawn Tennis Association (USNLTA) until 1920, and as United States National Lawn Tennis Association (USLTA) until 1975, it is the only Grand Slam tournament to have been played every year since its inception. In 1997, Arthur Ashe Stadium, the largest tennis stadium in the world with a capacity of 23,771 spectators, was opened. It is named after Arthur Ashe, the winner of the 1968 tournament—the first in which professionals were allowed to compete.

Over the years, the tournament has pioneered changes and promoted ideas that other tournaments later implemented for themselves, including the introduction of a tiebreak system to decide the outcome of sets tied at 6–6 in 1970, being the first Grand Slam tournament to award equal prize money to the men's and women's events in 1975, the installation of floodlights in 1975 in order to allow matches to be played at night, and the introduction of instant replay reviews of line calls using the Hawk-Eye computer system in 2006, the first Grand Slam tournament to do so.

The ILTF officially designated it as a major tournament in 1923. Today, the event has draws that host 256 singles players, 128 doubles teams and 32 mixed doubles teams, with the total prize money for the 2020 tournament being US$53,400,000, and a US television viewership of 700,000. Since 2004, the tournament has been preceded by the US Open Series, composed of North American hardcourt professional tournaments that lead up to and culminate with the US Open itself. The season is organized by the USTA as a way to focus more attention on American tennis tournaments by getting more of them on domestic television.

Grand Slam
The first player to win all four majors in a calendar year and thus complete the Grand Slam was Don Budge in 1938. To date, five singles players (two men, three women), nine doubles players (four men, five women) and one junior (boy) have completed the Grand Slam. In wheelchair disciplines, two singles players (one quad, one woman) and twelve doubles players (four men, eight women) have achieved it. Margaret Court is the only player to complete the Grand Slam in two disciplines, singles and mixed doubles (twice), while wheelchair players Diede de Groot and Dylan Alcott have completed one in both the singles and doubles disciplines of their respective classes.

Instances

Non-calendar-year Grand Slam

Terminology
In 1982, the International Tennis Federation (ITF) began offering a $1 million bonus to any singles player to win four consecutive major titles, even if they were won across two seasons. Although groups variously identified as the Men's International Professional Tennis Council, "abetted primarily by some British tennis writers", and "European tennis journalists" had advocated for the ITF to change the definition of "Grand Slam", ITF General Secretary David Gray made it clear that this was not going to happen. In a 1983 letter to tennis journalist Paul Fein, Gray clarified:

 
The ITF planned to offer the cash bonus for three years, apparently to encourage players to compete in all four major tournaments as much as to reward success at them.

Writing in 1982, before the ITF had announced their bonus, Neil Amdur said, "Now the sport spins nervously under the influence of big dollars and even bigger egos and tradition has almost gone the way of white balls and long flannels ... If the four major tournaments want to offer a $1 million incentive for any player in the future who can sweep their titles—and such talks have been rumored—that bonus would be a welcome addition. But changing what the Grand Slam is all about is like a baseball player believing that he 'hit for the cycle' after slugging a single, double and triple in the first game of a doubleheader and a home run in his first-time at-bat in the second game."

When Martina Navratilova won the 1984 French Open and became the reigning champion of all four women's singles discipline, she was the first player to receive the bonus prize in recognition of her achievement.  Some media outlets did, indeed, say that she had won a Grand Slam. Curry Kirkpatrick of Sports Illustrated wrote "Whether the Slam was Grand or Bland or a commercial sham tainted with an asterisk the size of a tennis ball, Martina Navratilova finally did it."

When Steffi Graf completed the Grand Slam in 1988, George Vecsey wrote, "Even the International Tennis Federation, which should have more respect for history, ruled in 1982 that winning any four straight majors constituted a Grand Slam—and offered a $1 million bonus for it ... But many tennis people, and most writers, and probably most fans, too, did not accept the new rules, and the ITF has dropped the gimmick."

When Rafael Nadal was on the verge of completing a non-calendar-year Grand Slam at the 2011 Australian Open, one writer observed, "Most traditionalists insist that the 'Grand Slam' should refer only to winning all four titles in a calendar year, although the constitution of the International Tennis Federation, the sports governing body, spells out that 'players who hold all four of these titles at the same time achieve the Grand Slam'." As of 2012, however, the ambiguity was resolved, with the ITF's current constitution stating "The Grand Slam titles are the championships of Australia, France, the United States of America and Wimbledon. Players who hold all four of these titles in one calendar year achieve the 'Grand Slam'."

Combining the Grand Slam and the non-calendar-year Grand Slam, only eight singles players on 11 occasions achieved the feat of being the reigning champion of all four majors, three men (Don Budge, Rod Laver, Novak Djokovic) and five women (Maureen Connolly, Margaret Court, Martina Navratilova, Steffi Graf, Serena Williams).

Instances 
The following list is for those players who achieved a non-calendar-year Grand Slam by holding the four major titles at the same time but not in the calendar year. Players who completed a Grand Slam within the same streak as a non-calendar-year Grand Slam are not included here.

Career Grand Slam
The career achievement of winning all four major championships in one discipline is termed a "Career Grand Slam". In singles, eight men (Fred Perry, Don Budge, Roy Emerson, Rod Laver, Andre Agassi, Roger Federer, Rafael Nadal, and Novak Djokovic) and ten women (Maureen Connolly, Doris Hart, Shirley Fry Irvin, Margaret Court, Billie Jean King, Chris Evert, Martina Navratilova, Steffi Graf, Serena Williams, and Maria Sharapova) have completed a Career Grand Slam. Four men (Emerson, Laver, Djokovic, and Nadal) and five women (Court, Evert, Navratilova, Graf, Williams) have achieved the feat more than once over the course of their careers.

Only six players have completed a Career Grand Slam in both singles and doubles: one male (Roy Emerson) and five females (Margaret Court, Doris Hart, Shirley Fry Irvin, Martina Navratilova, and Serena Williams). Court, Hart, and Navratilova are the only players to have completed a "Boxed Set", that is, winning all four major titles in singles, doubles, and mixed doubles.

Other related concepts

Boxed Set 
A "Boxed Set" refers to winning one of every possible major title in the singles, doubles, and mixed doubles disciplines throughout a player's career. Only three players have completed a Boxed Set: Doris Hart, Margaret Court, and Martina Navratilova. Court's second Boxed Set, completed in 1969, spans the pre-Open and Open Eras, but she later completed a set entirely within the Open Era in 1973.  The Boxed Set has never been completed by a male player.
 The event at which the Boxed Set was completed indicated in bold.

Golden Slam 
The term "Golden Slam" (initially "Golden Grand Slam") refers to the achievement of winning all four majors and the Olympic, Paralympic, or Youth Olympic gold medal in a calendar year. The phrase was coined in 1988, when Steffi Graf won that year's Australian Open, French Open, Wimbledon Championships, and US Open, and Olympic gold medal in singles.
Graf is the only singles player to have won all five tournaments in a calendar year.

Diede de Groot and Dylan Alcott also accomplished the feat, for wheelchair singles and wheelchair quad singles respectively.

Similarly, the term "non-calendar-year Golden Slam" has been used since 2013, when Bob and Mike Bryan won the 2012 Olympics, 2012 US Open, 2013 Australian Open, 2013 French Open and 2013 Wimbledon Championships doubles titles consecutively. Their achievement was also dubbed the "Golden Bryan Slam".

Career Golden Slam 
A player who wins all four majors and the Olympic or Paralympic gold medal during their professional career (or the Youth Olympic gold medal during their junior career) is said to have achieved a "Career Golden Slam".

Serena Williams is the only singles player to achieve the Career Golden Slam in both singles and doubles with her singles gold at the 2012 London Olympics. Dylan Alcott, Diede de Groot, and Shingo Kunieda have since also accomplished it in the wheelchair discipline.

Super Slam 
Soon after the Open Era began in 1968, the new professional tours each held a year-end championship (YEC), elite tournaments featuring only the top performers of the season. The return of tennis to the Olympics in 1988 gave rise to the notion of a "Super Slam" as a combination of the Golden Slam and YEC title. The YECs are currently the ATP Finals for the men's tour, WTA Finals for the women's tour, and the Wheelchair Tennis Masters for the wheelchair tennis tour.

In 2021, Diede de Groot became the first player to win all six titles in a calendar year, doing so in women's wheelchair singles. Steffi Graf achieved a "non-calendar-year Super Slam" in 1988 by the aforementioned titles consecutively, with her Golden Slam in 1988 following her victory at the 1987 Virginia Slims Championships, the women's year-end championship at the time.

Career Super Slam 
A player who wins all four majors, the Olympic or Paralympic gold medal, and the year-end championship throughout their career is said to have achieved a "Career Super Slam".

Wheelchair tennis players Diede de Groot and Shingo Kunieda are the only players in history to have completed a career Super Slam in both singles and doubles.

Three-Quarter Slam 
Several players have won three of the four majors in the same year, missing out on the Grand Slam by only one title, an achievement sometimes referred to as a "Three-Quarter Slam". In five notable instances, singles players won the first three events of the year and went to the final major tournament with the opportunity to complete the calendar-year Grand Slam but lost. These were Jack Crawford in 1933, Lew Hoad in 1956, and Novak Djokovic in 2021 in men's tennis, and Martina Navratilova in 1984 and Serena Williams in 2015 in women's tennis.

Surface Slam 
Since 1978, when the US Open changed its playing surface from clay to hard courts, the four majors have been contested on three surfaces: clay, hard and grass. A player who wins a major title on each of those three current surfaces in a calendar year is said to have achieved a "Surface Slam". From 1978 to 1987, the Australian Open and Wimbledon were played on grass, the French Open on clay and the US Open on hard, but since 1988 the Australian Open has also been played on hard courts. In singles, the feat has been accomplished by two men: Rafael Nadal in 2010 and Novak Djokovic in 2021; and three women: Martina Navratilova in 1984, Steffi Graf in 1988, 1993, 1995, 1996, and Serena Williams in 2002 and 2015.

Channel Slam 

Since their inceptions, the French Open has been contested on clay or sand courts and Wimbledon on grass courts, surfaces that favor very distinct play styles from each other. Wimbledon usually starts a few weeks after the end of the French Open, meaning that the players who have deep runs in the French Open have little time to recover mentally and physically and to adapt to the different surface conditions found at Wimbledon. This has thus made winning both tournaments consecutively in the same year considered to be one of the challenging feats in a tennis season. Players who do so are said to have achieved a "Channel Slam", in reference to the English Channel, the body of water separating France from the United Kingdom, the host countries of the French Open and Wimbledon. In singles tennis, this feat has been achieved by 12 men and 10 women. In the Open Era, Rod Laver, Björn Borg, Rafael Nadal, Roger Federer and Novak Djokovic are the only players to accomplish the feat in men's singles, and Margaret Court, Evonne Goolagong, Billie Jean King, Chris Evert, Martina Navratilova, Steffi Graf and Serena Williams in women's singles.

Pro Slam 
Before the start of the Open Era in 1968, only amateur players were allowed to compete in the four Grand Slam tournaments. Many male top players "went pro" in order to win prize money legally, competing on a professional world tour comprising completely separate events. From 1927 to 1967, the three tournaments later considered by some tennis journalists to have been the "majors" of the professional tour were:
 U.S. Pro Tennis Championships,
 French Pro Championship,
 Wembley Championships.

A player who won all three in a calendar year was considered retrospectively to have achieved a "Professional Grand Slam", or "Pro Slam". The feat was accomplished by Ken Rosewall in 1963 and Rod Laver in 1967, while Ellsworth Vines, Hans Nüsslein and Don Budge have won the three major trophies during their careers. The professional majors did not have a women's draw.

Grand Slam tournaments champions

Current champions
Each entry has an asterisk (*) linking to the tournament of that year.

Former champions
Per discipline

 Men's singles
 Women's singles
 Men's doubles
 Women's doubles
 Mixed doubles

 Boys' singles
 Girls' singles
 Boys' doubles
 Girls' doubles

 Men's wheelchair
 Women's wheelchair
 Quad wheelchair

Singles finals
 Men
 Women

See also

 List of Grand Slam–related tennis records
 Lists of tennis records and statistics
 Grand Slam (golf)

Notes

References

Bibliography

External links

 Official website of the Australian Open
 Official website of the French Open
 Official website of Wimbledon
 Official website of the US Open
 All-time Grand Slam tournament winners – Reference book

 
Tennis tours and series
Tennis terminology